Mark McElroy (October 16, 1906 – December 14, 1981) was a Democratic politician from Cleveland, Ohio, United States. He served in both houses of the Ohio General Assembly and was Ohio Attorney General from 1959 to 1963.

Biography
McElroy was born in Cleveland, Ohio in 1906. He attended the city schools, and Kenyon College, where he won nine letters in football, baseball and basketball. He was captain and quarterback in 1930 on the Kenyon Lords football team. After graduating, he earned a law degree in 1934 from the Case Western Reserve University School of Law.

Immediately after college, McElroy ran unsuccessfully for the Ohio House of Representatives. He was an active Democrat, serving as ward leader, precinct committeeman, and member of the county executive committee.

Before his election as Ohio Attorney General, McElroy was a member of the Ohio House of Representatives, Ohio State Senate, and Cleveland City Council. He also unsuccessfully challenged Anthony J. Celebrezze for Mayor of Cleveland.

McElroy was elected Attorney General in 1958 in a Democratic landslide, and served one four-year term.

McElroy was married to Marie Niznol in about 1956.

References

American football quarterbacks
Case Western Reserve University School of Law alumni
Cleveland City Council members
Kenyon College alumni
Kenyon Lords football players
Democratic Party members of the Ohio House of Representatives
Ohio Attorneys General
Democratic Party Ohio state senators
Lawyers from Cleveland
Players of American football from Ohio
1906 births
1981 deaths
20th-century American politicians
20th-century American lawyers